Ólína Guðbjörg Viðarsdóttir (born 16 November 1982) is an Icelandic football defender and a former member of the Icelandic national football team.

Club career
From 2009 until 2012, Ólína played club football in Sweden for KIF Örebro DFF. She joined Chelsea Ladies of the English FA WSL in January 2013. She returned to Iceland at the start of July and signed for Valur.  In November 2014 she signed for Fylkir.

In November 2016, Ólína signed with KR. She missed the majority of the 2017 Úrvalsdeild season due to a concussion she received in the second game of the season.

National team career
Ólína was part of Iceland's national team and competed in the UEFA Women's Championships in 2009 and 2013. She retired from international football in 2014.

Personal life
In June 2012, Ólína and partner Edda Garðarsdóttir had their first child when she (Ólína) gave birth to a daughter.

Achievements
Two times Icelandic champion
Three times Icelandic cup winner

References

External links

Chelsea Ladies – Olina Vidarsdottir

1982 births
Living people
Olina Gudbjorg Vidarsdottir
Olina Gudbjorg Vidarsdottir
Chelsea F.C. Women players
Women's Super League players
Olina Gudbjorg Vidarsdottir
Expatriate women's footballers in England
Expatriate women's footballers in Sweden
Olina Gudbjorg Vidarsdottir
Olina Gudbjorg Vidarsdottir
KIF Örebro DFF players
Damallsvenskan players
Lesbian sportswomen
Olina Gudbjorg Vidarsdottir
LGBT association football players
Olina Vidarsdottir
Women's association football defenders
Richmond Spiders women's soccer players
Central Michigan Chippewas women's soccer players
Olina Gudbjorg Vidarsdottir
Olina Gudbjorg Vidarsdottir
Olina Gudbjorg Vidarsdottir